Peceneaga is a commune in Tulcea County, Northern Dobruja, Romania, on the Danube's east bank. It is composed of a single village, Peceneaga.

According to the 2011 census, the commune has a population 1,569, of which almost all are people of Romanian ethnicity. It is named after the Pechenegs, a semi-nomadic Turkic people who settled in this place in the 10th/11th century.

References

Communes in Tulcea County
Localities in Northern Dobruja
Place names of Turkish origin in Romania